East End United is a Cayman Islander football club based in East End, which currently playing in Cayman Islands League First Division.

East End United is a club currently based on the youth.

The coach of the East End United team is Dion Brandon. 

The East End United Football field, known as the Donovan Rankine Stadium, was built in 1995 and it was opened by the legendary Brazilian Star, Pele, in the same year.

Achievements
Cayman Islands FA Cup: 1
 1995/96

See also
 caymanactive.com

Football clubs in the Cayman Islands